Hütschenhausen is a municipality in the district of Kaiserslautern, in Rhineland-Palatinate, Western Germany.

Sons and daughters of the community 

 Julius Koh (1884 – after 1936), chemist and manager of the chemical industry
 Julius Rüb (1886–1968), politician (SPD)
 Conny Plank (1940–1987), music producer
 Gerd Itzek (born 1947), politician (SPD)

References

Municipalities in Rhineland-Palatinate
Kaiserslautern (district)